Circle X is a not-for-profit ensemble theatre company located in Hollywood, California. Circle X's productions have been described by critics as "refreshingly original and imaginative" and "consistently stellar".

Overview
Circle X is a 501(c)(3) non-profit organization staffed by volunteers. Circle X was founded in 1996 by seven artists and to date has produced 27 plays in the Los Angeles area. Circle X's current artistic director is Jen Kays.

Circle X is part of the Los Angeles 99-Seat Equity Waiver theatre community, a group of theatres that may employ members of the Actors' Equity Association without paying them union wages. Similar theatres include Sacred Fools Theater Company and The Actors' Gang. They produce out of Atwater Village Theatre along with Ensemble Studio Theatre-LA.

Awards and nominations

Production history

2008/2009
Battle Hymn – By Jim Leonard, directed by John Langs

2007/2008
The Flu Season – By Will Eno, directed by Jonathan Westerberg
Love Loves a Pornographer – By Jeff Goode, directed by Jillian Armenante

2006/2007

Eurydice – By Sarah Ruhl, directed by John Langs
365 Days/365 Plays: Week 19 – By Suzan-Lori Parks, directed by Tom Elliot, Pete Friedrich, David Paul Wichert, Lisa Szolovits and Jamey Hood

2005/2006

The Brothers Karamazov – Adapted by Anthony Clarvoe, directed by John Langs
The Bigger Man – By Sam Marks, directed by David Vegh

2004

Sperm – By Tom Jacobson, directed by Tim Wright and Tara Flynn 
King Henry IV Part 1 – By William Shakespeare, Directed by Tara Flynn (in association with Shakespeare Festival Los Angeles).
You Are Here – By Anthony Backman, Kevin Fabian, Holly Gabrielson, Jennifer A. Skinner & Doug Sutherland 
At Play in the Valley of the Shadow of Chet – By Clown Corn Messiah, directed by Chuck Harper
Married But Solo – By Ally and Chris Loprete, directed by Thomas Fiscella

2003

Marley's Ghost – By Jeff Goode, directed by Matthew Bretz

2002

Laura Comstock's Bag-Punching Dog – By Jillian Armenante, Alice Dodd & Chris Jeffries, directed by Jillian Armenante
An American Book of the Dead – The Game Show – By Paul Mullin, directed by Jim Anzide and Jonathan Westerberg
ElectroPuss – By Trista Baldwin, directed by Paula Goldberg

2001

Dirigible] – By Dan Dietz, directed by Debbie Falb
Grendel – By John Gardner, adapted by Paul Mullin, directed by Jim Anzide
Schadenfreude – By Carlos A. Murillo, directed by Jonathan Westerberg
Edward II – By Bertolt Brecht, directed by Michael Michetti

2000

The Veil Plays – By Karen Hartman, directed by Julia Hamilton 
In Flagrante Gothicto – By Alice Dodd & Jillian Armenante, directed by Jillian Armenante
Fathers & Sons – By Ivan Turgenev, adapted by Brian Senter, directed by Michael Jaeger

1999

Louis Slotin Sonata – By Paul Mullin, directed by Jim Anzide and Jonathan Westerberg
Beatrice – By Suzanne Maynard, directed by Michael Michetti
Show and Tell – By Anthony Clarvoe, directed by Luck Hari
In the Sherman Family Wax Museum – By Alexander Woo, directed by Wade McIntyre

1998

Texarkana Waltz – By Louis Broome, directed by Allison Narver
The Rover – By Aphra Behn, directed by Michael Michetti
Great Men of Science Nos. 21 & 22 – By Glen Berger, directed by Jillian Armenante

1997
The Eight – By Jeff Goode, directed by Richard Augustine
City* – By Scott Organ, directed by Martha McFarland

1996

The Eight – By Jeff Goode, directed by John Lovick

Notable alumni

Michaela Watkins
 Jillian Armenante
 Brian Sidney Bembridge
Jeff Goode
Joel McHale
Connor Trinneer
John Getz

References

External links
Circle X Theatre's Website
Circle X Theatre's MySpace

Theatre companies in Los Angeles
Charities based in California
Arts organizations established in 1996